Streptomyces lasiicapitis is a bacterium species from the genus of Streptomyces which has been isolated from the head of the ant Lasius fuliginosus. Streptomyces lasiicapitis produces the antibiotic kanchanamycin.

See also 
 List of Streptomyces species

References

External links
Type strain of Streptomyces lasiicapitis at BacDive -  the Bacterial Diversity Metadatabase

 

lasiicapitis
Bacteria described in 2017